Archischoenobius is a genus of moths of the family Crambidae described by Speidel in 1984. Currently described species are endemic to China.

Species
Archischoenobius minumus Chen, Song & Wu, 2007
Archischoenobius nanlingensis Chen, Song & Wu, 2007
Archischoenobius nigrolepis Chen, Song & Wu, 2007
Archischoenobius pallidalis (South in Leech & South, 1901)

References

Schoenobiinae
Crambidae genera